Hidden Lake Airport  is a private-use airport located four miles (6 km) northeast of the central business district of New Port Richey, a city in Pasco County, Florida, United States. It is privately owned by Airport Investors, Inc. The airport is primarily available for the 150 residential homes located in the fly-in community of Hidden Lake Estates. However, the airport can be used at any time for emergency landings. 

The entirety of the Hidden Lake Estates and Airport is a licensed airport community with the Florida Department of Transportation All streets on the east side of the runway are officially taxiways, therefore aircraft have the right-of-way.

Facilities and aircraft 
There are 80 aircraft based at this airport: 75 single-engine and 5 multi-engine. Unfamiliar pilots are encouraged to review the informational videos on the Hidden Lake Airport Website.

References

External links 
Hidden Lake Airport (official site)

Airports in the Tampa Bay area
Residential airparks
Transportation buildings and structures in Pasco County, Florida
New Port Richey, Florida
Privately owned airports